Nugent is a rural locality in the local government areas (LGA) of Glamorgan–Spring Bay and Sorell in the South-east LGA region of Tasmania. The 2016 census has a population of 101 for the state suburb of Nugent.

It is notable for its local hall, in which many small gatherings occur for the locals only, maybe extending to nearby towns such as Sorell, Buckland and Dodges Ferry. It is a stereotypical "small country town", an ever-shrinking group of small establishments.

The other notable facts about Nugent include the fishery and game hunting property, Redbanks Fish and Field. Redbanks is a renowned wild fishery (the fish grow naturally in the lakes) and pheasant shooting location. People come from Britain, New Zealand, Europe and America for pheasant shooting and trout-fishing.

History
Nugent Post Office opened on 5 February 1883 and closed in 1968.
Nugent was gazetted as a locality in 1960.

Geography
Currajong Rivulet forms part of the northern boundary.

Road infrastructure 
Route C331 (Nugent Road) enters from the south and runs north-east to an intersection with Route C335 in the centre. Route C335 (Kellevie Road) enters from the south-east and runs north-west to the same intersection, from where it continues north-west as Nugent Road until it exits.

References

Towns in Tasmania
Localities of Sorell Council
Localities of Glamorgan–Spring Bay Council